Elias Hansen (born 1979) is an American sculptor, glass sculptor and installation artist.

Education 
Elias Hansen attended the New Orleans School of Glass and Print in New Orleans and the Larson Red Angus Ranch in Big Timber, MT in 2001. He also studied printmaking under Master Printer Keiko Hara at Whitman College in Walla Walla, WA from 1997 to 2001.  He subsequently attended the University of Ohio in Columbus, OH as an Artist in Residence in 2011.

Work

Hansen’s work has been shown in galleries and museums since 2004. He is represented by Anat Ebgi in Los Angeles and Halsey McKay Gallery in East Hampton, NY. His work is in the permanent collections of the Seattle Art Museum in Seattle, Tacoma Art Museum in Tacoma, Henry Art Gallery at the University of Washington in Seattle, Boise Art Museum in Boise, Colleción Jumex in Mexico City. He lives and works in New York City and Seattle, Washington.

Hansen is the brother of American sculptor Oscar Tuazon.

Further reading 
Rainbows from Atoms, Wall Street International Magazine, Feb 7, 2019

References

External links 
Artist's website

American abstract artists
Abstract sculptors
21st-century American sculptors
21st-century American male artists
American glass artists
American male sculptors
American installation artists
Glassblowers
Pacific Northwest artists
Artists from Seattle
Artists from Tacoma, Washington
Sculptors from Washington (state)
1979 births
Living people